The 1991 Southeastern Conference baseball tournament was held at Alex Box Stadium in Baton Rouge, LA from May 16 through 19.  won the tournament and earned the Southeastern Conference's automatic bid to the 1991 NCAA Tournament.

Regular-season results

Tournament 

 Georgia, Tennessee, Ole Miss, and Vanderbilt did not make the tournament.
 Due to rain that caused numerous delays, all games following the first round were shortened to seven innings.

All-Tournament Team

See also 
 College World Series
 NCAA Division I Baseball Championship
 Southeastern Conference baseball tournament

References 

 SECSports.com All-Time Baseball Tournament Results
 SECSports.com All-Tourney Team Lists

Tournament
Southeastern Conference Baseball Tournament
Southeastern Conference baseball tournament
Southeastern Conference baseball tournament
Baseball competitions in Baton Rouge, Louisiana
College baseball tournaments in Louisiana